Lanka is a 2017 Indian Telugu-language thriller film directed by Sri Muni. The film stars his wife, Raasi, in the lead role with Sai Ronak and the Bengali actress Ena Saha in supporting roles.

Cast 
 Raasi as Rebecca, a renowned Malayali actress
 Sai Ronak as Director Sai
 Ena Saha as Swathi
 Supreeth as a police officer
 Shiju
 Satya
 Satyam Rajesh

Release
The film was released to negative reviews.

The Deccan Chronicle wrote that the film lacks execution and narration and criticized the film's music. The Hindu wrote that "'Lanka' has an intriguing premise but is marred by long-winded narration".

References

External links

2017 films
Indian thriller films
2010s Telugu-language films
2017 thriller films